Siegert is a surname. Notable people include:

 Andrew Siegert (born 1982), Australian footballer
 Benjamin Siegert (born 1981), German footballer
 Bernhard Siegert (born 1959), German media theorist and media historian
 Daniel Siegert (born 1991), German singer
 Ferdinand Siegert (1865–1946), German paediatrician
 Hans Siegert (1914–1966), East German footballer and manager
 Herb Siegert (1924–2008), American footballer
 Herbert Siegert (born 1920), German football manager
 Larry Siegert (1923–2007), Royal New Zealand Air Force officer
 Martin Siegert, British geographer
 Tobias Siegert, German Grand Prix motorcycle racer